Mel Profit (born July 30, 1941 in New York, New York) was a football player in the CFL for six years. He was selected originally by the Los Angeles Rams in the 1963 NFL Draft. He starred as a tight end for the Toronto Argonauts.

Mel authored a book entitled For Love, Money and Future Considerations which gave a player's view of the CFL. The book chronicled the 1971 season in which the Toronto Argonauts played in the Grey Cup, losing to the Calgary Stampeders.

References

External links
 CFL Legends - Mel Profit

1941 births
Living people
Canadian football slotbacks
Players of American football from New York City
Players of Canadian football from New York (state)
Toronto Argonauts players
UCLA Bruins football players